Microsoft Space Simulator is a space flight simulator program, based on Microsoft Flight Simulator for MS-DOS. It was one of the first general-purpose space flight simulators and it incorporated concepts from astrodynamics, motion, and celestial mechanics. Microsoft Space Simulator is a space flight simulator program that was developed by Microsoft and released in 1994. The program allows users to experience the thrill of space flight, while also providing a realistic simulation of the physics and mechanics of space travel.

The program features a wide range of spacecraft and vehicles, including the Space Shuttle, the Russian Soyuz spacecraft, and the Apollo Lunar Module. Users can also create their own custom spacecraft and launch them into space.

One of the major features of Microsoft Space Simulator is its accurate physics engine, which simulates the behavior of spacecraft and vehicles in a realistic manner. This includes the effects of gravity, atmospheric drag, and propulsion. The program also allows users to simulate different scenarios, such as landing on the Moon or orbiting a planet.

In addition to its realistic simulation capabilities, Microsoft Space Simulator also includes a variety of educational resources, such as detailed information on the planets and moons in the Solar System, as well as information on the history of space exploration.

The program was well received by critics and space enthusiasts. It was considered one of the most realistic space flight simulator of its time. However, it was not a commercial success and it was not supported after 2000. The program's source code was not released, and there is no official support or patching for the program.

Overall, Microsoft Space Simulator is a detailed and accurate simulation of space flight, and it continues to be a popular choice among space enthusiasts and educators.

Development
Microsoft Space Simulator was released under the Microsoft Home line in 1994. It was developed by BAO Ltd., a company run by Bruce Artwick (who was also behind the development of Microsoft Flight Simulator) with Charles Guy as lead developer.

It provided support for 256-color graphics on three resolutions: 320x400, 640x400, and 800x600.
The graphics featured dithered gouraud shading 3D vessels, with texture mapped planets, moons, and deep-sky objects.

Physics engine
Microsoft Space Simulator uses Newton's laws of motion but takes account of relativistic effects by decreasing a spacecraft's acceleration as its speed approaches the speed of light. It does not take account of time dilation.

Atmospheric effect are not modeled and all planetary surfaces are treated as flat spheres. A limited collision detection between vessels is implemented by using docking ports.

Features
The simulator featured 14 different spacecraft, most of them futuristic.
Historical or current tech craft include the Space Shuttle (with its Manned Maneuvering Unit) and Apollo Command/Service Module and Lunar Module.

Reception
PC Gamer gave the simulator a score of 84% in its March 1995 issue, praising its graphics and realistic approach to space travel, while criticizing the poor or non-existent sound and the interface.

References

External links
 
 

1994 video games
DOS games
DOS-only games
Microsoft games
Realistic space simulators
Space flight simulator games
Video games developed in the United States